Scholars International Sports Club is a football club based in West Bay, Cayman Islands, which currently plays in the Cayman Premier League.

Current roster
2021-22

Achievements
 Cayman Islands League: 12

 1997–98, 2000–01, 2002–03, 2005–06, 2006–07, 2007–08, 2009–10, 2011–12, 2014–15, 2015–16, 2017–18, 2018–19, 2020–21

Cayman Islands FA Cup: 4
 2002–03, 2005–06, 2007–08, 2011–12

Cayman Islands Digicel Cup: 2
 2006–07, 2012–13

Performance in CONCACAF competitions

References

Football clubs in the Cayman Islands
Association football clubs established in 1977
1977 establishments in the Cayman Islands